Dark Medieval Times is the debut studio album by Norwegian black metal band Satyricon. It was recorded in August and September 1993 and released on October 25, 1993, through Moonfog Productions. In 2021 Satyricon announced that they are to reissue the album remastered, with different artwork, and released it on May 28.

Track listing
All songs written by Satyr.

Personnel
Satyricon
 Satyr (Sigurd Wongraven) – vocals, guitar and bass guitar
 Frost (Kjetil-Vidar Haraldstad) – drums
 Lemarchand (Håvard Jørgensen) – guitars (uncredited)

Session
 Torden – keyboards

Charts

References

External links
 Dark Medieval Times at Satyricon's official website

Satyricon (band) albums
1993 debut albums